Gorybia proxima is a species of beetle in the Faxon Family Cerambycidae. It was described by Martins in 1976.

References

Piezocerini
Beetles described in 1976